The vinous-breasted sparrowhawk (Accipiter rhodogaster) is a species of bird of prey in the family Accipitridae. It is endemic to the island of Sulawesi in Indonesia. Its natural habitats are subtropical or tropical moist lowland forest, subtropical or tropical mangrove forest, and subtropical or tropical moist montane forest.

References

Accipiter
Birds described in 1862
Endemic birds of Sulawesi
Taxonomy articles created by Polbot